The 11th Micronesian Games will be held in 2026 in Nauru. Nauru was selected as first-time hosts for the competition in July 2022.

Sports
The events of the games are still to be determined.

References

Micro
2026